Castello Normanno may refer to:
 Castello Normanno (Aci Castello)
 Castello Normanno (Paternò)
 Castello Normanno (Terlizzi)

See also 
 Castello Normanno-Svevo (disambiguation)